Tobechukwu Ejiofor known as iLLBLISS, is a Nigerian rapper, businessman and the owner of the talent managing outfit known as 'The Goretti Company', company responsible for launching the careers of Chidinma and Phyno, among others.  
Also popularly known as Oga Boss, he has received many nominations and won awards, the most notable being the award for Best Hiphop Video (for the hit "U Go Wound O!!") at the 2008 maiden edition of the Soundcity Music Video Awards. This award was presented to him by the American hip-hop star Nas.In 2019, he made a debut in acting by starring in the movieKing of Boys as Odogwu. His debut album, Dat Ibo Boy, which dropped in 2009, contained, "Aiye Po Gan! (Enuf Space)". He then released a new album July 2020, Illy Chapo X. His album IlLY CHAPO X have also been nominated for the category of best rap album for the HEADIES 2020 award. Considering the situation of the country back in 2019,  the indigenous rapper said President Buhari is silent many issues surrounding the country. He said “Mr. Buhari, are you still ruling us? You are mute on a lot of issues, I really don’t get you". He further added "We all feel like a ship with no captain, no direction. “This is a powerful country you have been installed to rule. Can you really just rule and show any level of empathy? Can you sir”.

Discography

Solo albums
Dat Ibo Boy (2009)
Oga Boss (2012)
 #Powerful (2015)
Illygaty:7057 (2016)
Illy Bomaye (2017)
Illosophy (2019)
Illbliss – Illy Chapo X (2020)

EPs
Position of Power, Vol. 1 (2012)
Position of Power, Vol. 2 (2014)

Collaborative albums
IllyZilla (with Teck Zilla) (2019)

Awards and nominations

References

External links 
 

Living people
Nigerian male rappers
21st-century Nigerian musicians
Nigerian entertainment industry businesspeople
Rappers from Enugu
21st-century male musicians
Year of birth missing (living people)